Le tue mani sul mio corpo (translation: Your Hands on My Body), aka Schocking, is a 1970 Italian giallo film directed by Brunello Rondi.

Plot 
A young neurotic dedicates his life to harassing others, especially his father and stepmother. Not even an encounter with a beautiful girl manages to keep him away from his world of macabre fantasies.

Cast 

 Lino Capolicchio: Andrea
 Colette Descombes: Carole 
 Erna Schürer: Mireille 
 José Quaglio: Mario 
 Pier Paola Bucchi: Clara, the maid 
 Anne Marie Braafheid: Nivel
 Elena Cotta

References

External links

1970 films
Giallo films
Films directed by Brunello Rondi
1970s crime thriller films
1970s Italian films